Myrsine adamsonii is a species of plant in the family Primulaceae. It is endemic to French Polynesia. The epithet adamsonii commemorates Alastair Martin Adamson.

References 

Endemic flora of French Polynesia
adamsonii
Data deficient plants
Taxonomy articles created by Polbot